Kottak, formerly known as KrunK, is a punk rock/pop punk group formed in Los Angeles in 1996 by James Kottak a.k.a. Jimmy Ratchitt, ex-drummer for the hard rock band Scorpions and his ex-wife Athena Lee. Current members are:

 James Kottak/Jimmy Ratchitt - lead vocals and guitar
 Nils Wandrey - bass backing vocals
 Francis Ruiz - drums

The band describe themselves as "Cheap Trick meets Green Day, on a bad day" and their album Therupy certainly continues to build the band's infamy.

In early November 1997, KrunK walked away with two awards in the 2nd Annual Rock City News Awards for bands in Los Angeles. The band was named BEST PUNK BAND, and Athena won BEST FEMALE DRUMMER. In the 7th Annual L.A. Music Awards, Athena was nominated for BEST DRUMMER (Males & Females). She was the first female ever nominated in the history of the L.A. Music Awards.

In 2006, the band changed its name from KrunK to Kottak, citing the need for a more original name now that "krunk" has become a general term.

Discography
 Greatist Hits (1998)
 Therupy (2006)
 Rock & Roll Forever (2010)
 Attack (2011)

References

External links

Pop punk groups from California
Punk rock groups from California
Musical groups established in 1996
Musical groups from Los Angeles